The simple-station Avenida Chile is part of the TransMilenio mass-transit system of Bogotá, Colombia, opened in the year 2000.

Location
The station is located in northern Bogotá, specifically on Avenida NQS between Calles 69 and 71A.

History
This station opened in 2005 as part of the second line of phase two of TransMilenio construction, opening service to Avenida NQS. It serves the visitors to the Cementerio de Chapinero (Chapinero Cemetery), and the surrounding areas.

Station services

Old trunk services

Trunk services

Feeder routes
This station does not have connections to feeder routes.

Inter-city service
This station does not have inter-city service.

See also

Bogotá
TransMilenio
List of TransMilenio Stations

TransMilenio